Hansjörg Schellenberger is a German oboist and conductor born in 1948.

He won the first prize at the German Jugend musiziert Competition with seventeen, which led to a scholarship enabling him to further his education at Interlochen (Michigan, USA). He continued his studies in Munich with Manfred Clement and he attended master classes with Heinz Holliger. During this period he took part in numerous concerts, many of them dedicated to contemporary music, and obtained prizes in several international competitions, among them, second prize in the ARD International Music Competition in Munich.

In the seventies he was soloist of the Cologne Radio Orchestra and from 1980-2001 of the Berlin Philharmonic Orchestra.
Between 1980 and 2001 he has played under conductors such as Karajan, Leinsdorf, Giulini, Muti, Mehta and Abbado. He has dedicated a great part of his artistic activity to chamber music with groups such as the Wind Ensemble of the Berlin Philharmonic and the Vienna-Berlin Ensemble.

From 1981 to 1991 he taught at the Berlin Music Academy. He has also been Guest Professor at the Chigiana Academy in Sienna, Italy and participated with his master classes in the Magister Musicae project. Currently he is principal professor of oboe at the Reina Sofía School of Music in Madrid.

In 1991 Schellenberger founded the Berliner-Hadyn-Konzerte cycle, which he continues to conduct himself. He has recorded Beethoven's and Mozart's Piano and Wind Quintets and Poulenc's Trio for piano, oboe and bassoon with J. Levine and M. Turkovic.

From the 2021/22 season, Hansjörg Schellenberger will be chief conductor and artistic director of the Berliner Symphoniker.

References

External links
Official WebSite: www.hansjoerg-schellenberger.de

German classical oboists
Male oboists
German male conductors (music)
German music educators
1948 births
Living people
Interlochen Center for the Arts alumni
Academic staff of the Reina Sofía School of Music
Grammy Award winners
Recipients of the Cross of the Order of Merit of the Federal Republic of Germany
Players of the Berlin Philharmonic
21st-century German conductors (music)
21st-century German male musicians